Sony Pictures Imageworks Inc. is a Canadian visual effects and computer animation studio headquartered in Vancouver, British Columbia, with an additional office on the Sony Pictures Studios lot in Culver City, California. SPI is a unit of Sony Pictures Entertainment's Motion Picture Group.

The company has been recognized by the Academy of Motion Picture Arts and Sciences with Oscars for their work on Spider-Man 2 and the computer-animated short film The ChubbChubbs!, and received many other nominations for their work.

SPI has provided visual effects for many films; most recent include The Meg, Men in Black: International, and Spider-Man: Far From Home. They also provided services for several of director Robert Zemeckis' films, including Contact, Cast Away, The Polar Express, and Beowulf.

Since the foundation of its sister company Sony Pictures Animation in 2002, SPI would go on to animate nearly all of SPA's films, including Open Season, Surf's Up, Spider-Man: Into the Spider-Verse, and films in the Cloudy with a Chance of Meatballs, Smurfs and Hotel Transylvania franchises, in addition to animating films for other studios such as Arthur Christmas for Aardman Animations (co-produced by SPA), Storks and Smallfoot for the Warner Animation Group, The Angry Birds Movie and its sequel for Rovio Animation, Over the Moon for Netflix and Pearl Studio, and The Sea Beast for Netflix Animation.

History 
Sony Pictures Imageworks was formed in 1992 with five employees to use computers to help plan complicated scenes for live-action films. Located in the former TriStar building, their first work was a previsualization for the 1993 film Striking Distance.

To fill the gaps between VFX jobs, SPI decided to partake in a more profitable animation business. Its first independent animated effort was the 5-minute short The ChubbChubbs! directed by Eric Armstrong. In 2002, it won the Oscar for Best Animated Short. Early Bloomer, released in 2003, was the division's second short film and originally made as a storyboarding exercise. SPI completed its first feature animation project in 2006 with the release of Open Season, which was produced by sister company Sony Pictures Animation.

In 2007, SPI acquired Indian visual effects studio FrameFlow to take advantage of lower labor costs. Renamed to Imageworks India, a modern facility was opened in Chennai a year later. To leverage New Mexico's tax rebates and talent base, a satellite production facility was opened in 2007 in Albuquerque, becoming the largest post-production operation in the state. In 2010, SPI opened a production studio in Vancouver, British Columbia, in order to take advantage of the local talent pool and government film production incentives. Two years later, the studio doubled its Vancouver facilities. At the same time, the Albuquerque studio was closed down due to declining New Mexico's subsidies and difficulty with attracting artists to move there.

In the beginning of 2014, as part of Sony's cost-cutting move, SPI transferred a portion of its technology team from its headquarters in Culver City to Vancouver. By May 2014, entire headquarters and production had been moved to Vancouver, with only a small office remaining in Culver City. At the same time, SPI closed down its Indian studio, laying off around 100 employees. A year later, over 700 artists moved into a new 74,000-square feet headquarters in Vancouver.

Technology 
During 2009-2010, SPI made transition from traditional biased, multi-pass rendering system to a largely singlepass, global illumination system incorporating modern ray-tracing and physically based shading techniques. They have achieved that with Arnold Renderer, an unbiased stochastic ray tracer. Arnold, started in 1997 by Marcos Fajardo, was co-developed between 2004 and 2009 with SPI, where Marcos was employed, and a commercial branch is being developed by Marcos' Madrid based company Solid Angle SL (now owned by Autodesk). Arnold was used on projects such as Monster House, Cloudy with a Chance of Meatballs, 2012, Alice in Wonderland, The Smurfs, Arthur Christmas and is being used on all upcoming SPI's films.

Filmography 
Sony Pictures Imageworks has provided visual effects and digital animation for the following films:

Upcoming

Television 
 The Real Adventures of Jonny Quest ("The Edge of Yesterday")
 Stuart Little the Animated Series
 Love, Death & Robots ("Lucky 13") and ("In Vaulted Halls Entombed")
 The Falcon and the Winter Soldier ("One World, One People")
 Hawkeye (2 episodes)
 The Guardians of the Galaxy Holiday Special (TV special)

See also 
 Sony Pictures Animation
 Animal Logic
 Pacific Data Images
 Digital Domain
 DNEG
 Framestore
 Blue Sky Studios
 Industrial Light & Magic
 Rhythm & Hues
 Dream Quest Images
 Wētā FX
 Wētā Workshop
 Moving Picture Company (MPC)
 Nitrogen Studios
 Image Engine

References

External links 
 

Companies based in Culver City, California
Companies based in Vancouver
American animation studios
Mass media companies established in 1992
Canadian animation studios
Computer animation
Sony Pictures Entertainment
Sony subsidiaries
Visual effects companies
Best Visual Effects Academy Award winners